Tahir Jelani Walsh (born 24 February 1994) is an Antiguan sprinter. He finished fourth in the boys' 100 metres at the 2010 Summer Youth Olympics. At the 2016 Summer Olympics in Rio de Janeiro, he competed as a member of the men's 4 × 100 m relay team. The team finished 6th in their heat with a season's best time of 38.44 seconds, but did not qualify for the final.

References

External links

 

1994 births
Living people
Antigua and Barbuda male sprinters
Athletes (track and field) at the 2010 Summer Youth Olympics
Athletes (track and field) at the 2014 Commonwealth Games
Athletes (track and field) at the 2018 Commonwealth Games
Commonwealth Games competitors for Antigua and Barbuda
Olympic athletes of Antigua and Barbuda
Athletes (track and field) at the 2016 Summer Olympics
People from St. John's, Antigua and Barbuda